The 1905 Wabash Little Giants football team represented Wabash College as an independent during the 1905 college football season. Led by second-year head coach Frank Cayou, the Little Giants compiled a record of 6–5. The team managed one of its most impressive upsets when it defeated Notre Dame, 5–0, on October 21, at South Bend. It proved to be the Fighting Irish's only home-field loss in 125 games between 1899 and 1928. Notre Dame had originally considered the game a "practice game" and expected to win easily when the game was scheduled the previous year, but began to take the team more seriously as the 1905 season developed.

Schedule

Roster
Shank, Right end
Knudsen, Right tackle
Hess, Right guard
Brown, Center
Sprow, Center
Sutherland, Left guard
Williams, Left tackle
Frurip, Left end
Miller, Quarterback
Myers, Right halfback
Harp, Left back
Spaulding, Left halfback and team captain

References

Wabash
Wabash Little Giants football seasons
Wabash Little Giants football